Bernd Diener (born 19 June 1959) is a German motorcycle speedway rider. He competes in Speedway, Longtrack and Grasstrack and had been at World Championship level since the mid 1980. He has twice been on the podium in the World Longtrack Championship 1996 & 2004 and won the European Grasstrack Championship once in 1999.

World Longtrack Championship

One Day Finals
 1986  Pfarrkirchen (7th) 10pts
 1992  Pfarrkirchen (16th) 2pts
 1993  Mühldorf (13th) 6pts
 1994  Marianske Lazne(6th) 15pts
 1995  Scheeßel(15th) 3pts
 1996  Herxheim (Runner-up) 23pts

Grand-Prix
 1998 - 4 apps (12th) 38pts
 1999 - 5 apps (7th) 56pts
 2000 - 5 apps (5th) 60pts
 2001 - 4 apps (7th) 45pts
 2002 - 2 apps (16th) 24pts
 2003 - 6 apps (7th) 58pts
 2004 - 5 apps (Third) 71pts
 2005 - 4 apps (13th) 27pts
 2006 - 3 apps (14th) 18pts
 2007 - 3 apps (9th) 34pts
 2008 - Did Not Compete
 2009 - 4 apps (20th) 12pts
 2010 - 1 app (24th) 3pts
 2011 - Did Not Compete
 2012 - 4 apps (14th) 34pts
 2013 - Did Not Compete
 2014 - 1 apps (20th) 5pts
 2015 - Did Not Compete
 2016 - Did Not Compete
 2017 - Did Not Compete
 2018 - 5 apps (7th) 54pts

Best Grand-Prix Results
  Forus Second 2012
  Parchim Third 2001, 2002
  Marmande Third 2004
  Herxheim Third 2018

Team Championship
 2008  Wertle (First) 7/45pts (Rode with Gerd Riss, Stephan Katt, Matthias Kroger)
 2012  St. Macaire (First) 22/48 (Rode with Matthias Kroger, Jorg Tebbe, Stephan Katt)

European Grasstrack Championship

Finals

 1988  Nandlastadt (14th) 4pts
 1994  Cloppenburg (8th) 11pts
 1995  Joure (Second) 22pts
 1999  Werlte (Champion) 25pts
 2000  St. Colomb de Lauzen (4th) 15pts
 2001  Noordwolde (5th) 12pts
 2005  Schwarme (7th) 11pts
 2006  La Reole (5th) 18pts
 2007  Folkestone (8th) 9pts
 2009  Berghaupten (10th) 11pts
 2015  Staphorst (9th) 16pts
 2017  Hertingen (9th) 15pts

References

 https://www.speedweek.com/langbahngp/news/133724/Bernd-Diener-ist-mit-59-Jahren-immer-noch-Weltspitze.html
 https://www.speedweek.com/steckbrief/285/Bernd-Diener.html
 https://www.stadtanzeiger-ortenau.de/tag/bernd-diener
 https://grasstrackgb.co.uk/bernd-diener/

1959 births
Living people
German racing drivers
German speedway riders
Individual Speedway Long Track World Championship riders
People from Gengenbach
Sportspeople from Freiburg (region)